WZOK (97.5 FM), branded as 97ZOK, is a radio station serving the Rockford, Illinois area with a Top 40 (CHR) format. It is under ownership of Townsquare Media.

On August 30, 2013, a deal was announced in which Townsquare would acquire 53 Cumulus Media stations, including WZOK, for $238 million. The deal was part of Cumulus' acquisition of Dial Global; Townsquare and Dial Global were both controlled by Oaktree Capital Management. The sale to Townsquare was completed on November 14, 2013.

History
WROK-FM signed on the air in 1949, and in 1976, the call letters changed to the current WZOK. In late 1980, WZOK changed its format from AOR to its current Top 40/CHR format, and was the dominant CHR station in the Rockford metropolitan area, including portions of Northern Illinois such as Belvidere, Cherry Valley, DeKalb, and Woodstock, and portions of Southern Wisconsin such as Janesville and Beloit.

References

Previous logo

External links
97 ZOK - Official Website

Contemporary hit radio stations in the United States
ZOK
Radio stations established in 1949
Townsquare Media radio stations
1949 establishments in Illinois